Dambahena Grama Niladhari Division is a Grama Niladhari Division of the Maharagama Divisional Secretariat of Colombo District of Western Province, Sri Lanka. It has Grama Niladhari Division Code 528A.

President's College, Maharagama are located within, nearby or associated with Dambahena.

Dambahena is a surrounded by the Maharagama West, Pannipitiya North, Maharagama Town, Pamunuwa and Polwatta Grama Niladhari Divisions.

Demographics

Ethnicity 

The Dambahena Grama Niladhari Division has a Sinhalese majority (92.7%). In comparison, the Maharagama Divisional Secretariat (which contains the Dambahena Grama Niladhari Division) has a Sinhalese majority (95.7%)

Religion 

The Dambahena Grama Niladhari Division has a Buddhist majority (89.0%). In comparison, the Maharagama Divisional Secretariat (which contains the Dambahena Grama Niladhari Division) has a Buddhist majority (92.0%)

Gallery 

 Dambahena Devalaya is the oldest religious site located in the center of the village

References 

Grama Niladhari Divisions of Maharagama Divisional Secretariat